Toorbos is a 2019 South African drama film directed by Rene van Rooyen about a young woman confronting a conflict between her ideals and those of her husband. It was selected as the South African entry for the Best International Feature Film at the 93rd Academy Awards, but it was not nominated.

Plot
Shortly before the outbreak of World War II, a young woman from a community of poor subsistence farmers and foresters meets, falls in love with, and marries a wealthy townsman. She begins to adapt to his way of life, including being subservient to her husband. However, she soon chafes in this role. Her discomfort increases when she learns of her husband's disregard for the forest from which she came.

Cast
 Sean Brebnor as Faan Mankvoet
 Elani Dekker as Karoliena Kapp
 Stiaan Smith as Johannes Stander

See also
 List of submissions to the 93rd Academy Awards for Best International Feature Film
 List of South African submissions for the Academy Award for Best International Feature Film

References

External links
 

2019 films
2019 drama films
South African drama films
Afrikaans-language films